Girl A is a novel by Abigail Dean that was published in January 2021. For the crime thriller, which includes the abuse of children, Dean has said that she wanted to "focus on the effects of trauma and the media glare, rather than the suffering which triggers them."

In 2019 it was reported that Dean received a six-figure sum from UK publisher HarperCollins for Girl A and her next novel. She reportedly received a seven-figure deal from US publisher Viking Press. In May 2020 it was reported that Johan Renck was in negotiations to direct and executive produce a limited series of Girl A, for 3000 Pictures at Sony Pictures. Girl A was published in the UK and Australia in January 2021 and in the USA in February 2021.

Publication details
Girl A. London: HarperCollins, 2021. .
Girl A. New York: Viking, 2021. .

References 

English thriller novels
2021 debut novels
2021 British novels
HarperCollins books